Princess Bismai Bimalasataya or Phra Chao Boromwongse Ther Phra Ong Chao Bismai Bimalasataya (RTGS: Phitsamai Phimonsat) (20 December 1881 – 6 February 1936) was the Princess of Siam (later Thailand). She was a member of Siamese Royal Family. She was a daughter of Chulalongkorn, King Rama V of Siam and Chao Chom Manda Ruen.

She died on 6 February 1936, at the age of 54.

Ancestry

1881 births
1936 deaths
19th-century Thai women
20th-century Thai women
19th-century Chakri dynasty
20th-century Chakri dynasty
Thai female Phra Ong Chao
Dames Grand Commander of the Order of Chula Chom Klao
Children of Chulalongkorn
Daughters of kings